I'll Take Romance is a 1937 romantic musical film directed by Edward H. Griffith, starring Grace Moore, Melvyn Douglas, Helen Westley, Stuart Erwin and Margaret Hamilton.

Plot
An opera manager (Melvyn Douglas) tries to woo a contract-breaking soprano (Grace Moore) into performing in Buenos Aires.

Cast
Grace Moore as Elsa Terry
Melvyn Douglas as James Guthrie
Helen Westley as Madame Della aka Madella
Stuart Erwin as 'Pancho' Brown
Margaret Hamilton as Margot
Walter Kingsford as William Kane
Richard Carle as Rudi

Songs
Songs and arias performed by Grace Moore
I'll Take Romance (music by Ben Oakland, lyrics by Oscar Hammerstein II)
Gavotte (Manon, music by Jules Massenet, lyrics by Henri Meilhac and Philippe Gille) 
Drinking Song (La traviata, music by Giuseppe Verdi, lyrics by Francesco Maria Piave) 
First Act Duet (Madama Butterfly, music by Giacomo Puccini, lyrics by Giuseppe Giacosa and Luigi Illica)

Other Songs
Quintet and Finale (Martha, music by Friedrich von Flotow, lyrics by Friedrich Wilhelm Riese
She'll Be Comin' Round the Mountain (Traditional)
'A Frangesa! (music and Italian lyrics by Pasquale Mario Costa, English lyrics by Milton Drake)

References

External links

1937 films
1930s English-language films
1930s romantic musical films
Films directed by Edward H. Griffith
Columbia Pictures films
American romantic musical films
American black-and-white films
Films with screenplays by Jane Murfin
1930s American films